Speed Walking is a 2014 Danish drama film directed by Niels Arden Oplev. It is based on the novel of the same name by Morten Kirkskov.

Plot 
In 1976 in provincial Denmark, 14-year-old Martin (Villads Bøye) is about to be confirmed when his mother dies of cancer. The weeks leading up to his confirmation are difficult and turbulent, as Martin's father and older brother are distraught and Martin must try to keep the family together. In addition, he must deal with his feelings, sexuality and friendships.

Cast 
 Villads Bøye as Martin
 Frederik Winther Rasmussen as Kim
 Kraka Donslund Nielsen as Kristine
 Anders W. Berthelsen as Hans
 Sidse Babett Knudsen as Lizzie
 Pilou Asbæk as Onkel Kristian
 Jens Jørn Spottag
 Jakob Lohmann
 Christine Gjerulff
 Anette Støvelbæk
 Kristian Halken
 Steen Stig Lommer
 Stine Stengade
 Anne Louise Hassing
 David Dencik

References

External links
 
 

2014 films
2014 drama films
2010s Danish-language films
Films directed by Niels Arden Oplev
Danish drama films
Danish LGBT-related films
Gay-related films